Kelmscott House is  Grade II* listed Georgian brick mansion at 26 Upper Mall in Hammersmith, overlooking the River Thames. Built in about 1785, it was the London home of English textile designer, artist, writer and socialist William Morris from 1878 to 1896.

Originally called The Retreat, Morris renamed it after the Oxfordshire village of Kelmscott, where he had lived at Kelmscott Manor from June 1871.

Nearby, Morris began his "adventure in printing" with his private press, the Kelmscott Press, which he started  at 16 Upper Mall in 1891.

Previous owners
The property was once owned by Sir Francis Ronalds' family. In 1816, he built the first electric telegraph in its garden. From 1867, then called The Retreat, it was the family home of poet, minister and novelist George MacDonald who wrote two of his most popular children's books, At the Back of the North Wind (1871) and The Princess and the Goblin (1873), there.

It was the London home of English textile designer, artist, writer and socialist William Morris from October 1878 until his death in October 1896.

Today
The building is a private house, though the basement and coach house entrance serve as headquarters of the William Morris Society, whose premises are open to the public on Thursday and Saturday afternoons.

The William Morris Society temporarily re-formed the local branch of the Socialist League (UK, 1885) to participate in the 2011 London anti-cuts protest. The banner was paraded again on 20 October 2012.

References

Further reading

External links

 The William Morris Society UK
 The William Morris Society in the United States
 The William Morris Society of Canada

Art museums and galleries in London
Arts and Crafts movement
Decorative arts museums in England
Georgian architecture in London
Grade II* listed buildings in the London Borough of Hammersmith and Fulham
Grade II* listed houses in London
History of the London Borough of Hammersmith and Fulham
History of the telegraph
Houses in the London Borough of Hammersmith and Fulham
Museums in the London Borough of Hammersmith and Fulham
William Morris
Carriage houses